The Australian Cricket Hall of Fame is a part of the Australian Gallery of Sport and Olympic Museum in the Australian Sports Museum at the Melbourne Cricket Ground. This hall of fame commemorates the greatest Australian cricketers of all time, as the "selection philosophy for the hall of fame focuses on the players' status as sporting legends in addition to their outstanding statistical records." Inductees must be retired from international cricket for at least five years. The Australian Cricket Hall of Fame was an idea conceived by the Melbourne Cricket Club (MCC) to honour Australia's legendary cricketers. It was opened on 6 December 1996 by the then Prime Minister, John Howard.

The hall of fame opened with ten inaugural members, ranging from Fred Spofforth, a pace bowler who retired from Test cricket in 1887, to Dennis Lillee who played his last Test match in 1984. , the Australian Cricket Hall of Fame comprises 61 members. All twelve members of the Australian Cricket Board Team of the Century are included, six of them amongst the inaugural members. The vast majority are men; Belinda Clark was the first woman admitted to the hall when she was inducted in 2014 (three years after she was inducted into the ICC Cricket Hall of Fame). Five female Test captains have been admitted, along with 21 of their male counterparts. In December 2020, Johnny Mullagh became the first Indigenous Australian to be inducted into the hall of fame. Regarded as a standout player of the Aboriginal team which toured England in 1868, Mullagh is also the only member to have not played Test cricket for Australia.

The current selection committee comprises:

 Peter King – ACHOF chairman and current MCC committee member 
 Belinda Clark – Former Test captain
 Mark Taylor – Former Test captain
 Paul Sheahan – Former Test batsman and former MCC President
 Todd Greenberg – Australian Cricketers' Association CEO
 Nick Hockley – Cricket Australia CEO
 Greg Baum and Ben Horne – Media representatives

New members are inducted at the annual Australian Cricket Awards night.

Members of the Hall of Fame
Key

See also
 Allan Border Medal
 Australia national cricket team
 Australia women's national cricket team
 Cricket Australia

References

External links
 List of inductees

 
Halls of fame in Australia
Sports museums in Australia
Cricket
Awards established in 1996
Cricket museums and halls of fame
1996 establishments in Australia